The 1930–31 Magyar Kupa (English: Hungarian Cup) was the 13th season of Hungary's annual knock-out cup football competition.

Final

See also
 1930–31 Nemzeti Bajnokság I

References

External links
 Official site 
 soccerway.com

1930–31 in Hungarian football
1930–31 domestic association football cups
1930-31